Douglas Thomson (born 10 August 1891) was a Scottish professional footballer who played as an inside forward.

References

1891 births
Footballers from Dundee
Scottish footballers
Association football inside forwards
Dundee Violet F.C. players
Dundee United F.C. players
Millwall F.C. players
Aberdeen F.C. players
Grimsby Town F.C. players
Dartford F.C. players
Scottish Junior Football Association players
Scottish Football League players
English Football League players
Year of death missing
People convicted of theft